Retro Game Challenge is a Nintendo DS game developed by indieszero and published by Namco Bandai Games and Xseed Games in North America. It is based on the television series GameCenter CX, and Shinya Arino gave much input into the game creation process. The game was released on November 15, 2007 in Japan and February 10, 2009 in North America.

A sequel, Retro Game Challenge 2, was released in Japan in February 26, 2009 and was never officially localized into English by Xseed, but received a fan translation.

Gameplay
In the game, the player controls a boy or girl who plays retro games in order to appease the Demon Arino (based on the TV show's host Shinya Arino). The Demon Arino gives four challenges to complete for each game.

Each game is original but with graphics, sound, and game-play elements which make it look old or retro. Many of them are similar in both gameplay and appearance to real Famicom games. They come with fully illustrated manuals.

Occasionally there will be a fake gaming magazine, Game Fan Magazine, that has articles about the games, rankings (with other fictional games named), and "game advice" from GameCenter CX ADs who have appeared over the seasons of the TV show. In the case of the North American version, the pseudonyms of journalists better known in English-speaking countries were used.

Some parts of the various games are inspired by actual challenges that Arino has faced in his TV episodes. For example, the bonus character in the second half of stage 1 of "Star Prince" is taken from his attempt to get bonus points from playing Star Force in season 1. The various "special" continue tricks (like in Haggle Man) come from the several instances in which Arino must use these features to complete tasks on the show. Even the ending to the game pulls a trick from Takeshi no Chōsenjō from season 1.

Reception

The game received a score of 33/40 from Famitsu. 

As of June 24, 2009, Retro Game Challenge had sold fewer than 100,000 copies in North America. This was viewed as disappointing for its North American publisher, Xseed Games, discouraging them from also localizing the sequel. Director of Publishing Ken Berry stated that sales were initially strong but died down.

Sequels
GameCenter CX: Arino no Chōsenjō 2 is the sequel to Retro Game Challenge and was released on February 26, 2009, in Japan. Like the original, it largely consists of NES-styled games reminiscent of actual games released in the late 1980s through mid-1990s. However, this game also features games styled after Super NES, Game Boy, Game Boy Color, and Famicom Disk System games, as well as variants on games included in Retro Game Challenge and a "game trainer" modeled after a Game & Watch. All together, this title has 15 games in one. The game received an English fan translation in 2014.

Another sequel of the game, named GameCenter CX: 3-Choume no Arino, was released for the Nintendo 3DS in 2014, exclusively in Japan.

Reception
The magazine Game Informer put it on their list of the best games of 2009.

Notes

References

External links
 Official US website
 Retro Game Challenge at Hardcore Gaming 101

2007 video games
2009 video games
Bandai Namco games
Nintendo DS games
Nintendo DS-only games
Retro-style video games
Single-player video games
Video games based on television series
Video games developed in Japan
Video games set in the 1980s
Fan translation
Video games about video games
Xseed Games games
Indieszero games